Ferrovia Adriatico Sangritana (FAS), also known as Ferrovia Sangritana is a private transport company of Italy operating train services in the Abruzzo region. The company is owned by the region of Abruzzo. The company is a railway undertaking and an infrastructure manager. The company was previously known as Ferrovie Adriatico Appenino.

As a railway company, the company extends its interest in the freight sector serving as a carrier even outside of their own network on the routes of RFI. The company has also taken over the management of provincial and inter-regional bus services. The company also manages some important industrial and port connections in the province of Abruzzo.

Lines

Sangritana railway
The company manages the Sangritana railway. A new line was built between San Vito Chietino and Lanciano, which meant the old line with many curves was closed. The new line also means direct trains can operate from Lanciano to Pescara. The line between Lanciano and Castel di Sangro is currently closed, waiting to be rebuilt.

Saletti-Archi railway
There is a branch line used for freight services transporting vans for Sevel between Fossacesia and Saletti. A line is under construction from Saletti to Archi, which will connect with the Sangritana railway.

Train services
The company provides local rail services between Lanciano, San Vito, Pescara, Termoli and Giulianova, with a branch to Teramo.

Fleet

Depots
 Lanciano (closed)
 Treglio 
 Saletti

References

External links

Railway companies of Italy
Companies based in the Province of Chieti